is a railway station on the Osaka Metro Tanimachi Line in Miyakojima-ku, Osaka, Japan. It is numbered "T17".

Layout
The station has an island platform serving two tracks on the second basement ("B2F") level. Around half of the trains return for Fuminosato, Kire-Uriwari and Yaominami at this station.

Platforms

History
The station opened on 29 May 1974.

Surrounding area
 Osaka City General Hospital
 Miyakojima Police Station
 Sakuranomiya Station (JR West)

Another station called Miyakojima Station is under construction nearby on the Osaka Higashi Line, scheduled to open in spring 2019.

External links

 Official Site 
 Official Site

See also
 List of railway stations in Japan

Osaka Metro stations
Railway stations in Japan opened in 1974